Margaret Ely Webb (1877–1965) was an American illustrator, printmaker, and bookplate artist. She was part of the Arts and Crafts movement of the early 1900s.

Early life

Webb was born in 1877 to a New Jersey family with three sons. Her father died sometime before 1918, when Webb's mother married Charles Albert Storke, a prominent citizen of Santa Barbara, California and mayor from 1898 to 1901.

Webb studied in New York at the Art Students' League and at Cooper Union. She lived in Boston and New Jersey, before settling in Santa Barbara in 1922.

Illustration

Webb was an important figure in the Arts and Crafts movement of the early 1900s. She was known for her intricate, pen-and-ink bookplate designs. According to the Santa Barbara Independent, "one critic, writing in August 1908, confessed that the beauty of Webb’s plates had shattered his prejudice against women artists." Webb created bookplates for notable Santa Barbarans, including her step-brother, Thomas M. Storke.

In the 1940s, Webb took up woodblock printing as a medium for bookplates. She also painted watercolors and oils. Webb is primarily remembered for her work as an illustrator of children's literature; her illustrations also appeared in many magazines.

Memberships and awards
Member of the American Artists Professional League.
In 1954, Webb's bookplate art was honored by the Dutch Bookplate Society.

Personal life
Webb was also a talented musician and a horticulturalist. The gardens at her home in Santa Barbara were admired throughout the South Coast.

Death and legacy
In 1950, Webb sold her longtime home on West Micheltorena Street and moved to Mountain Drive, where she converted the garage into her studio. She died in 1965. A collection of her watercolors of wildflowers was given to the Santa Barbara Museum of Natural History, and her illustrations would eventually become part of the collections of the Library of Congress and the British Museum.

Bookplates
Some of Margaret Ely Webb's bookplates are held in the William Augustus Brewer Bookplate Collection at the University of Delaware.

References

External links

 
 
Works by Margaret Ely Webb at The Online Books Page
Bookplates by Margaret Ely Webb in the University of Delaware Library's William Augustus Brewer Bookplate Collection
 

American women illustrators
American illustrators
Artists from New Jersey
Artists from Santa Barbara, California
Artists from California
Art Students League of New York alumni
Cooper Union alumni
Arts and Crafts movement artists
1870s births
1965 deaths
American women printmakers